Fofos is a small island off the southern coast of the island of Guam. It is connected to the mainland by the Merizo Barrier Reef.

See also
Cocos Lagoon
List of rivers of Guam

Further reading
National Centers for Coastal Ocean Science
Bendure, G. & Friary, N. (1988) Micronesia:A travel survival kit. South Yarra, VIC: Lonely Planet.

Bibliography
The Island of Guam By Leonard Martin Cox

References

Geography of Guam
Islands of Guam